Ivonne Aracely Ortega Pacheco (born November 27, 1972) is a Mexican politician from Yucatán affiliated with the Institutional Revolutionary Party (PRI), former Governor of Yucatán and current federal deputy to the LXIII Legislature of the Mexican Congress. She is Yucatan's first elected female governor, although the second to serve, after Dulce María Sauri who served as interim governor from 1991 to 1994. She is the sixth woman to serve as governor of a Mexican state.

Political career
Ortega has occupied different positions inside the PRI of Yucatán. In 1998 she was elected municipal president (mayor) of Dzemul, Yucatán. In 2001 she served as local deputy in the Congress of Yucatán and in 2003 she was elected as a federal deputy representing Yucatán's Second District. In 2006 she was elected senator, to serve from 2006 to 2012, but she left that position after two months to run for Governor of Yucatán in the 2007 Yucatán gubernatorial election. Ortega won the election to serve as governor from 2007 to 2012 (the term was originally set to end in 2013 but a state reform was made to have the state election coincide with the 2012 presidential election in Mexico). She was inaugurated as governor on August 1, 2007.

Candidate for Governor
In 2006 she expressed her intention to be candidate of her party for Governor of Yucatán in the 2007 elections and asked permission to leave her duties as a senator. Her nomination was a surprise, because she had occupied the post of senator for only two months (with her alternate, Renán Cleominio Zoreda Novelo, sworn in on October 30), and faced candidates with more political career than her.

On December 4, 2006, the PRI's National Executive Committee was presented the results of the Consulta Mitofsky poll conducted between Ortega and 5 other candidates in the PRI party of Yucatán: Carlos Sobrino Sierra, Erick Rubio Barthell, Dulce María Sauri, Orlando Paredes Lara and Rubén Calderón Cecilio. Ortega was the most favored by the Yucatecans, and consequently was declared a candidate of unity with the agreement of the rest of the candidates. Again her victory was considered a surprise because the former interim governor Dulce María Sauri had been seen as the favorite. On January 13, 2007, she was sworn as the PRI candidate for the governorship of Yucatan.

On February 26 her candidacy was endorsed by the Ecologist Green Party of Mexico and the Alliance for Yucatan Party, which formed a three-party coalition with PRI for the 25 local deputations and 106 municipalities.

Federal deputy
The PRI placed Ortega Pacheco on its list for proportional representation federal deputies from the third electoral region in 2015, sending her to the Chamber of Deputies for the LXIII Legislature. She presides over the Communicaciones Commission and also sits on the Constitutional Points and Rules and Parliamentary Practices Commissions.

Electoral history

Alleged corruption

Unfinished hospital in Tekax, Yucatan 
In February 2015 the ex governor of Yucatan Ivonne Ortega Pacheco was accused by the ex governor of Yucatan Patricio Patrón Laviada of deviating funds for the construction of a hospital in Tekax in the amount of at least 112 million Mexican pesos. Patrón Laviada started the construction of the hospital in 2006, with had an estimated cost of 52.07 million Mexican pesos. Leaving the hospital with a progress of 67%, Patrón Laviada left office in 2007, year in which Ortega Pacheco became governor of Yucatan. By 2010 governor Ortega Pacheco had spent more than 100 million Mexican pesos in the further construction of the hospital, which she never finished.

In 2016 the governor of Yucatán Rolando Zapata Bello made an investment of 80 million Mexican pesos in order to finish the hospital, which should start operations at the end of 2016.

Controversy

The Palace of Mayan Civilization: unfinished 
The Palace of Mayan Civilization, conceived as the first piece of a “Mayan Disneyland” in Yucatan has been abandoned since 2012. About 90 million Mexican pesos were spent in the development of the project.

Located 11.5 kilometres of Pisté, the project had 520,000 square meters for its development. In the first stage a parking lot and the foundations for 5 building would be built. This stage counted with 70 million Mexican pesos of federal funds. The second and third stages would have had an estimated cost of 140 million Mexican pesos, but in 2012 the project was postponed until 2014, which already had a 50% progress. However, in November 2014, the 13 thousand square meters of construction, which started on December 21 of 2009, were abandoned and have started to be swallowed by the jungle.

Gran Museo del Mundo Maya: financial disaster 
With a progress of 90%, the Gran Museo del Mundo Maya (Great Museum of the Maya World) was inaugurated in September 2012 by Ivonne Ortega Pacheco. The museum, one of Ortega Pacheco's main projects, proved to be a financial disaster.

Ortega Pacheco informed that the total cost of the building would be of 411 million Mexican pesos. However, the state government will have to pay for the construction and operation of the museum 4,643 million Mexican pesos during 21 years at a yearly rate of 221.1 million Mexican pesos, according to information based on official documents obtained by Mayaleaks.

References

1972 births
Living people
Institutional Revolutionary Party politicians
Municipal presidents in Yucatán (state)
Members of the Chamber of Deputies (Mexico)
Members of the Senate of the Republic (Mexico)
Governors of Yucatán (state)
Politicians from Yucatán (state)
Women members of the Senate of the Republic (Mexico)
Women mayors of places in Mexico
Members of the Congress of Yucatán
21st-century Mexican politicians
21st-century Mexican women politicians
Women governors of States of Mexico
Women members of the Chamber of Deputies (Mexico)
20th-century Mexican politicians
20th-century Mexican women politicians